Miécimo da Silva Sports Complex is an indoor sporting arena located in Campo Grande neighborhood, Rio de Janeiro city, Brazil.  It opened in 1997.  For the 2007 Pan American Games, it hosted the karate, skating, and squash events.  Capacity of the arena is 4,000 people.

External links
Venue information

Indoor arenas in Brazil
Venues of the 2007 Pan American Games
Sports venues in Rio de Janeiro (city)